The Archdiocese of Bobo-Dioulasso is the Metropolitan See for the Ecclesiastical province of Bobo-Dioulasso in Burkina Faso.

History
 15 December 1927: Established as Apostolic Prefecture of Bobo-Dioulasso from the Apostolic Vicariate of Bamako, Mali and the Apostolic Vicariate of Ouagadougou
 9 March 1937: Promoted as Apostolic Vicariate of Bobo-Dioulasso
 14 September 1955: Promoted as Diocese of Bobo-Dioulasso
 5 December 2000: Promoted as Metropolitan Archdiocese of Bobo-Dioulasso

Special churches
The seat of the archbishop is Cathédrale Notre Dame de Lourdes in Bobo Dioulasso.

Bishops

Ordinaries, in reverse chronological order
 Metropolitan Archbishops of Bobo-Dioulasso (Roman rite), below
 Archbishop Paul Yemboaro Ouédraogo: 13 November 2010–present
 Archbishop Anselme Titianma Sanou: 5 December 2000  – 13 November 2010; see below
 Bishops of Bobo-Dioulasso (Roman rite), below
 Bishop Anselme Titianma Sanou: 12 December 1974  – 5 December 2000: see above
 Bishop André-Joseph-Prosper Dupont, M. Afr.: 14 September 1955  – 12 December 1974; see below
 Vicars Apostolic of Bobo-Dioulasso (Roman rite), below
 Bishop André-Joseph-Prosper Dupont, M. Afr.: 8 July 1941  – 14 September 1955; see above
 Bishop Louis-Joseph-Ephrem Groshenry, M. Afr.: 17 June 1937  – 15 May 1941
 Prefects Apostolic of Bobo-Dioulasso (Roman rite), below
 Father Marcel Paternôt, M. Afr.: 26 October 1934 - 1937
 Father Césaire-Jean-Hippolyte Esquerre, M. Afr.: 11 January 1928  – 18 June 1934

Other priests of this diocese who became bishops
Jean-Baptiste Kpiéle Somé, appointed Bishop of Diébougou in 1968
Lucas Kalfa Sanou, appointed Bishop of Banfora in 1998

Suffragan Dioceses
 Banfora
 Dédougou
 Diébougou
 Gaoua
 Nouna

See also
 List of Roman Catholic dioceses in Burkina Faso

Sources
 GCatholic.org

Roman Catholic dioceses in Burkina Faso
 
Roman Catholic ecclesiastical provinces in Burkina Faso
1927 establishments in the French colonial empire